Akron Airport may refer to:

Akron Airport in Akron, New York, United States (FAA: 9G3)
Akron-Canton Airport serving Akron, Ohio, United States (FAA/IATA: CAK)
Akron Fulton International Airport in Akron, Ohio, United States (FAA: AKR, IATA: AKC)
Colorado Plains Regional Airport in Akron, Colorado, United States (FAA/IATA: AKO)